Lechang East is a railway station in Lechang, Shaoguan, Guangdong Province, China. The station opened on 1 May 2017. It is on the Beijing–Guangzhou high-speed railway. It is also the last station before the train goes across the border to Hunan Province.

References

Railway stations in Guangdong
Railway stations in China opened in 2017
Buildings and structures in Shaoguan